Sidney Carolyn Littlefield Kasfir (1939–2019) was an art historian of African art.

Career 

Sidney Littlefield Kasfir received a MA in art history from Harvard University and a Ph.D. in African art from the University of London in 1979 with a dissertation on visual arts of the Idoma people. She was a professor at Emory University for two decades.

Works 

 Contemporary African Art (1999)
 African Art and the Colonial Encounter: Inventing a Global Commodity (2007)
 Central Nigeria Unmasked: Arts of the Benue River Valley (2011, co-edited)
 African Art and Agency in the Workshop (2013, co-edited)

References

Further reading

External links 

 

1939 births
2019 deaths
Emory University faculty
Harvard University alumni
Alumni of the University of London
Historians of African art
American art critics